Kholodny (masculine), Kholodnaya (feminine), or Kholodnoye (neuter) is the name of several inhabited localities in Russia.

Urban localities
Kholodny, Magadan Oblast, an urban-type settlement in Susumansky District of Magadan Oblast

Rural localities
Kholodny, Rostov Oblast, a khutor in Ryabichevskoye Rural Settlement of Volgodonskoy District in Rostov Oblast
Kholodnoye, Korochansky District, Belgorod Oblast, a khutor in Korochansky District of Belgorod Oblast
Kholodnoye, Prokhorovsky District, Belgorod Oblast, a selo in Prokhorovsky District of Belgorod Oblast
Kholodnoye, Novosibirsk Oblast, a village in Suzunsky District of Novosibirsk Oblast
Kholodnaya (rural locality), a settlement in Kindigirsky evenkiysky Selsoviet of Severo-Baykalsky District in the Republic of Buryatia